Talina Gantenbein  (born 18 August 1998) is a Swiss freestyle skier. She competed in the 2018 Winter Olympics, in ski cross.

She won a gold medal in ski cross at the 2016 Winter Youth Olympics.

References

External links

 

1998 births
Living people
Swiss female freestyle skiers
Olympic freestyle skiers of Switzerland
Freestyle skiers at the 2018 Winter Olympics
Freestyle skiers at the 2022 Winter Olympics
Freestyle skiers at the 2016 Winter Youth Olympics
Youth Olympic gold medalists for Switzerland
21st-century Swiss women
Youth Olympic silver medalists for Switzerland